Handschmann is a surname. Notable people with the surname include:

Peter Handschmann (born 1957), Austrian ice dancer
Susi Handschmann (born 1959), Austrian ice dancer